Hatton is a major town in the Nuwara Eliya District of Central Province, Sri Lanka governed by the Hatton-Dickoya Urban Council. Hatton is a major centre of the Sri Lankan tea industry.

Hatton is one of the busiest cities in the hill country of Sri Lanka and is colloquially known as the tea capital of the country, as it is the central point for most upcountry tea growing regions, such as Maskeliya, Talawakelle, Bogawantalawa and Dickoya.

Hatton was founded during the British colonial times in order to serve the coffee plantations and latter tea estates. The name of the town refers to the village in Aberdeenshire, Scotland. A number of the surrounding tea estates are also named after Scottish villages.

Hatton serves as a gateway to Adam's Peak (Sri Pada) and Sinharaja Forest Reserve, but is better known for its Ceylon tea plantations. Over 48% of the town's population employed on tea estates.

Transport

The Hatton Railway Station is located on the Main Line (Colombo-Badulla) railway line

The town is located on the A7 highway (Avissawella-Nuwara Eliya) a part of the Avissawella-Nuwara Eliya main road.

Attractions
 Dunbar Ground
 Holy Cross Church (Catholic)
Jummah Masjid / islamic mosque 
 Maanica Pillayaar/Sri Manickapillayar Kovil, a Hindu temple dedicated to Ganesh
Castlereigh Dam
 Shri Nigrodharamaya Buddhist Temple
 Singha Malai Tunnel, the longest railway tunnel in Sri Lanka (located between Hatton and Kotagala)
 Sri Muthu Mariyamman Kovil, a Hindu temple
 Subramaniam Kovil, Hindu temple dedicated to Murugan

Education
 Highlands Central College
 Highlevel International School 
 Life-spring English Academy 
 Oxbridge International College 
 St. Gabriel's Convent
 St. John Bosco's College 
 Shannon Tamil Maha Vidyalayam 
 Sri Pada Central College 
 Univenture international 
 Webster International School

Economy
Hatton is the largest town in the Nuwara Eliya District. A number of major corporations have branch offices in Hatton, servicing industries including textiles, tea, furniture and information technology. The Hatton National Bank, the largest privately owned commercial bank in the country, and Brown and Company, a leading engineering firm, were both founded in Hatton.

Neighbourhoods
Nuwara Eliya
Maskeliya
Bogawantalawa
Talawakelle
Dickoya
Norwood
Watawala
Ginigathena
Kotagala

References

External links

Populated places in Nuwara Eliya District
Populated places in Central Province, Sri Lanka